Spine journal may refer to:
The Spine Journal
Spine (journal)